Karst topography is a geological formation shaped by the dissolution of a layer or layers of soluble bedrock, usually carbonate rock such as limestone or dolomite, but also in gypsum. It has also been documented for weathering-resistant rocks, such as quartzite, given the right conditions. This is an incomplete list of the major karst landscape areas of the world.

Africa

Madagascar 
 Anjajavy Forest, western Madagascar
 Ankarana Reserve, Madagascar
 Madagascar dry deciduous forests, western Madagascar
 Tsingy de Bemaraha Strict Nature Reserve, Madagascar

South Africa 
 Oudtshoorn, Western Cape Province, KwaZulu Natal.
 West Rand, Gauteng and North West Province, KwaZulu Natal.

Asia

China 
 Area around Guilin and Yangshuo
 Jiuzhaigou Valley and Huanglong Scenic and Historic Interest Area, (UNESCO World Heritage Site)
 Shaanxi tiankeng cluster, discovered in 2016, it is one of the largest in the world comprising forty-nine sinkholes and more than fifty funnels ranging from 50–100 metres in diameter.
 South China Karst, World Heritage Site
 Stone Forest
 Xiaozhai Tiankeng, also known as the Heavenly Pit, is the world's largest sinkhole.
 Zhangjiajie National Forest park, forming part of the Wulingyuan scenic area, World Heritage Site
 Wulong Karst, Wulong County, Chongqing Municipality

Georgia 
 Arabika Massif (including Voronya Cave – the world's deepest cave), Abkhazia, Georgia

India 
 Borra Cave or Bora Guhalu in Andhra Pradesh.  Patal Gupha in Uttarakhand.

Indonesia

 Ajamaru Plateau, West Papua
 Bantimurung, Indonesia
 Gunung Sewu, Indonesia
 Rammang-Rammang, in the Bantimurung - Bulusaraung National Park in (Maros Regency) Indonesia, known as The Spectacular Tower Karst Area
 Sangkulirang-Mangkalihat, East Kalimantan
 Pindul Cave, near Yogyakarta

Israel and palestine 
 Avshalom Cave, also known as "Soreq Cave" or "Stalactites Cave", in the Judean hills 
 Ofra region, Palestinian territories
 The Upper Galilee region

Japan 
 Akiyoshi Plateau, Japan
 Atetsudai and Taishakudai Plateaus, Japan
 Shikoku Karst, Japan
 Hiraodai Plateau, Japan
 Okinoerabujima Island and other islets of Ryukyu Islands, Japan

Laos 
 Khammouane, Laos
 Vang Vieng, Laos

Lebanon 

 Jeita Grotto, Lebanon
 Parts of Mount Lebanon

Malaysia 
 Gunung Mulu National Park, Malaysia
 Kilim Karst Geoforest Park, Langkawi, Malaysia
 Kinta Valley, Perak, Malaysia
 Perlis State Park, Perlis, Malaysia
 Batu Caves, Selangor, Malaysia

Myanmar 

 Shan State, Kayin State, Kayah State

Palestine
 Ofra region, Palestinian territories

Philippines 
 El Nido, Palawan, Philippines
 Coron, Palawan, Philippines
 Puerto Princesa, Palawan, Philippines
 Baras, Rizal, Philippines
 Tanay, Rizal, Philippines
 Sagada, Mountain Province, Philippines
 Chocolate Hills, Bohol, Philippines
 Gigante Islands, Carles, Iloilo
 Negros Island, Negros Oriental, Philippines
 Virac, Catanduanes, Philippines
 Caramoan Peninsula, Camarines Sur, Philippines
 Cebu Province, Philippines

South Korea 
 Gangwon-do (South Korea), South Korea
 Northwestern North Chungcheong Province, South Korea

Thailand 
 Ao Phang Nga National Park, Thailand
 Krabi region, Thailand
 Phangnga Bay Area, southern Thailand
 Doi Nang Non, northern Thailand

Taiwan 
 Kenting National Park, Taiwan

Turkey 
 Taşeli, Turkey

Vietnam 

 Hạ Long Bay, Vietnam
 Phong Nha-Kẻ Bàng National Park, Vietnam
 Tam Cốc-Bích Động in Ninh Bình Province, Vietnam
 Đồng Văn Karst, Global Geopark

Europe

Albania 
 Biza area in central Eastern Albania
 Mali me Gropa
 Albanian Alps
 Karaburun Peninsula, Albania

Austria 
 Eastern region of the Northern Limestone Alps in the provinces of Salzburg, Upper Austria, Styria, and Lower Austria, forming huge limestone plateaus such as the Steinernes Meer, Hagengebirge, Tennengebirge, Dachstein, Totes Gebirge, Hochschwab, Rax, and Schneeberg.
 Area around Graz, Styria.

Bosnia and Herzegovina 

Karst poljes (Bosnian, Croatian, Serbian: kraška polja)
 Popovo polje in Herzegovina region of Bosnia and Herzegovina
 Livanjsko polje, near Livno in Završje (Tropolje) region of Bosnia and Herzegovina
 Nevesinjsko polje, near Nevesinje in Herzegovina region of Bosnia and Herzegovina
 Gatačko polje, near Gacko in Herzegovina region of Bosnia and Herzegovina
 Glamočko polje, near Glamoč in Završje (Tropolje) region of Bosnia and Herzegovina
 Duvanjsko polje, near Duvno in Završje (Tropolje) region of Bosnia and Herzegovina
 Mostarsko polje, near Mostar in Herzegovina region of Bosnia and Herzegovina
 Kupreško polje, near Kupres in the border area of Završje (Tropolje) region and Bosnia (region) of Bosnia and Herzegovina
 Vjetrenica (which means "wind cave" or "blowhole"), largest and most important cave
 Neretva river
 Trebisnjica river

Bulgaria 
 Central Rhodope karst (including Trigrad Gorge), Bulgaria
 Devnya Valley, Varna Province, Bulgaria
 Dragoman marsh, Bulgaria
 Karlukovo Karst Geocomplex

Croatia 
 Regions of Dalmatia, Lika (Plitvice Lakes National Park), Gorski kotar, Istria, Kvarner and the islands in Croatia
 See also: list of caves in Croatia

Czech Republic 
 Moravian Karst, Czech Republic
 Bohemian Karst, Czech Republic

Estonia

France 
 Pyrenees
 Massif de Larra-Belagua, near Pic d'Anie
 Pierre-Saint-Martin
 Arbailles
 Massif Central
 Causses (Causse du Larzac,...)
 French Prealps
 Sainte-Baume
 Mont Sainte-Victoire
 Alpilles
 Luberon
 Vaucluse Mountains
 Dévoluy Mountains
 Vercors Plateau
 Chartreuse Mountains
 Bauges
 Jura
 Bugey
 Pays d'Ouche (Normandy)

Germany 
 Hönnetal at Balve
 South Harz and Kyffhaeuser Gypsum Karst
 Swabian Alb region in the federal state of Baden-Württemberg

Hungary 
 Region of the Mecsek Mountains
 Bükk, a plateau in northeastern Hungary
 Bakony Hills in Transdanubia
 Buda Hills, thermal karst area
 Aggtelek Karst and the largest cave in Hungary (Aggtelek National Park, UNESCO WHS)

Ireland 
 Burren in County Clare
 Ballydotia, near Moycullen, in Co. Galway
 Dringeen Oughter, Lough Mask, in Co. Mayo
 Tullyskeherny, near Manorhamilton, in Co. Leitrim

Italy 
 Gargano, in Apulia, northern
 Murge, in Apulia and Basilicata, southern
 Carso(), a plateau in southwestern Slovenia and northeastern Italy
 Piano Grande surrounding Castelluccio (Norcia), in the Monti Sibillini National Park
 Montello, in Veneto, a plateau in conglomerate rock, venetian sub-alps hills

Lithuania 
 North Region, located mostly in Biržai district municipality and Pasvalys district municipality.

Malta 
 Wied iż-Żurrieq and Dingli, West

Montenegro 
 Dinaric Alps region (70% of the territory of Montenegro is Karst)

Poland 
 Kraków-Częstochowa Upland (Jura Krakowsko-Częstochowska)
 Holy Cross Mountains (Góry Świętokrzyskie) with the Jaskinia Raj (Raj Cave)
 Tatra Mountains including the Jaskinia Wielka Śnieżna (Great Snowy Cave) – the longest and the deepest cave in Poland
 Śnieżnik Mountains with the largest cave outside Tatra Mountains, Jaskinia Niedźwiedzia
 Kaczawskie Mountains small region near the town Wojcieszów

Portugal 
 
 Natural Park Serras d'Aire and Candeeiros

Romania 
 Apuseni Mountains, Romania
 Bucegi Mountains, Romania

Serbia 
 Dinaric Alps region
 merokarst of eastern Serbia

Slovakia 
 Slovak Paradise, Slovakia
 Slovak Karst, Slovakia
 Tatry, Slovakia
 Nízke Tatry, Slovakia
 Muránska planina, Slovakia

Slovenia 

 Region of Inner Carniola, Goriška, Upper Carniola and Lower Carniola
 Karst Plateau(), a plateau in southwestern Slovenia and northeastern Italy, which gave the name to karst topography.

Spain 

 Picos de Europa and Basque mountains, northern Spain
 Larra-Belagua, Navarre, northern Spain
 Serra del Cadí mountain range, Spain
 Garraf Massif Natural Park area, Spain
 Ciudad Encantada in the province of Cuenca, Castilla-La Mancha, Spain
 El Torcal de Antequera nature preserve, southern Spain
 El Cerro del Hierro, in Sevilla, southern Spain

Sweden 
 Various places in the limestone and marl island of Gotland, most notably the Lummelunda cave system. Depending on definition the stacks of Gotland can be classified as karst.
 The Abisko-Torneträsk area in northern Sweden contains several cave systems developed on carbonate stata of the Caledonide nappes.

Switzerland 

Ukraine 
 Podolia and Bukovina regions in the northeastern edge of the Carpathian Mountains which includes some of the largest gypsum caves in the world, including the Optymistychna Cave, which is over 200,000 meters in length, making it the longest cave in Eurasia, the third longest in the world, and the longest gypsum cave in the world.

United Kingdom

England 
 White Peak of the Peak District, around Matlock, Castleton (including Thor's Cave)
 Mendip Hills including Cheddar Gorge
 Yorkshire Dales including Gaping Gill and the Three Counties System.
 Forest of Dean including the Clearwell Caves and Mines

N. Ireland 
 Marlbank-Cuilcagh Mountain Region, in County Fermanagh

Scotland 
 Assynt
southeast Skye 
 near Kentallen

Wales 
 Southern and western regions of the Brecon Beacons National Park
 South Pembrokeshire and Gower
 Parts of Flintshire e.g. Esclusham Mountain
 Great Orme and adjacent parts of North Wales coast

North America

Canada 
 Marble Canyon, British Columbia
 Monkman Provincial Park, British Columbia
 Northern Vancouver Island, British Columbia
 Niagara Escarpment, Ontario
The Napanee Limestone Plain, Ontario
 Port au Port Peninsula, Newfoundland
 Nahanni region in the Northwest Territories
 Wood Buffalo National Park in Alberta and the Northwest Territories
 Avon Peninsula, Nova Scotia
 St-Jude, Quebec

Mexico 
 Cenotes of the Yucatán Peninsula
 Sótanos of the Sierra Gorda, Querétaro
 Cacahuamilpa grottos, Guerrero
 Chiapas Plateau, Chiapas
 Nahá–Metzabok
 Sierra de Tamaulipas
 Zacatón

United States 
Alaska
 Kosciusko Island, southeastern Alaska
Arizona
 Texas Canyon, Cochise County
Florida
 Much of Florida’s landscape is composed of “karst” landforms. Florida Karst Topography 
 Florida Karst Resources
Illinois
 Illinois Caverns State Natural Area and Illinois Sinkhole Plain in Monroe County
Indiana
 Mitchell Plain and uplands of southern Indiana

Kentucky
 Bluegrass region of Kentucky
 Mammoth Cave region
Michigan
 Presque Isle County near and around Rogers City
 Pictured Rocks National Lakeshore near Munising, Michigan
Missouri, Arkansas
 Ozark Plateau of Missouri and Arkansas
Nevada
 Lehman Caves located within Great Basin National Park in eastern Nevada
New Mexico
 Carlsbad Caverns National Park
Oklahoma
 Arbuckle Mountains and Arbuckle Uplift
 Kamas Ranch and Alabaster Cavern area
Oregon
 Deschutes River basin
South Dakota
 Black Hills (Wind Cave, Jewel Cave)
Tennessee
 Cumberland Plateau
 Grassy Cove Karst Area
Texas
 Texas Hill Country, Texas and its northern extensions, including the Palo Pinto Mountains
Utah
 Ricks Spring in northeast Utah
Virginia
 Shenandoah Valley, Virginia
West Virginia
 Germany Valley Karst Area
 Smoke Hole Canyon
 Greenbrier River watershed
 Swago Karst Area
Wisconsin, Minnesota, Iowa, Illinois
 Driftless Area of southwest Wisconsin, southeast Minnesota, northeast Iowa and northwest Illinois

Central America and Caribbean

Belize 
 Eastern foothills of Maya Mountains including parts of the Cockscomb Basin Wildlife Sanctuary, Belize
 Great Blue Hole near the center of Lighthouse Reef, Belize

Cuba 
 Mogotes in Viñales Valley

Dominican Republic 
 Los Haitises National Park

Jamaica 
 Cockpit Country region

Puerto Rico 
 Northern Karst of Puerto Rico
Southern Karst of Puerto Rico

South America

Brazil 
 Lagoa Santa Karst, Minas Gerais, Brazil

Chile 
 Madre de Dios Island and Guarello Island (the world's southernmost limestone mine), Magallanes, Chile

Venezuela 
 The Sierra de San Luis in Falcón State, location of Haitón del Guarataro, the deepest limestone cave in Venezuela.

Oceania

Australia 
 Cutta Cutta Caves Nature Park and Kintore Caves Conservation Reserve, Katherine, Northern Territory
 Leeuwin-Naturaliste National Park, near Margaret River, south west Western Australia
 Northern Swan Coastal Plain, Perth, Western Australia
 Naracoorte Caves National Park, South Australia
 Jenolan Caves, New South Wales
 Wombeyan Caves, New South Wales
 Mole Creek Karst National Park, Tasmania
 Nullarbor Plain, South Australia and Western Australia
 Yarrangobilly Caves area, New South Wales

New Zealand 
 Takaka Hill, Tasman Region (South Island)
 Mount Owen, Tasman Region (South Island)
 Waitomo, southern Waikato Region (North Island)
 Oparara Basin Arches, Buller District of the West Coast Region (South Island)
 Paparoa National Park, West Coast Region (South Island)
 Craigieburn area, Canterbury District (South Island)

Papua New Guinea 
 Nakanai Mountains, East New Britain

References 

.
 01
Karst
Karst areas
Dinaric karst formations